Cotahuasi may refer to:

 Cotahuasi, town in Peru
 Cotahuasi Canyon, Peru
 Cotahuasi District, Peru